Chill Out Zone is an extended-play by UK grime artist Wiley, released independently on 12 July 2011 for free digital download. Two singles were released in preparation for the album: "Seduction" featuring Alexa Goddard and "If I Could" featuring Ed Sheeran.

Background
On 8 March 2011, Wiley announced he would be working on a project with UK producer Jay Weathers in which he will release songs from him and Ed Sheeran, Alexa Goddard, Meleka, Sinead Harnett, Cherri V and Opium. During the production stages of the project, Wiley decided the songs were good enough to be compiled into an album, and in May 2011 he revealed the project had now turned into his next album, titled "Chill Out Zone" The album is the first to display Wiley's new genre which is a cross between R&B and grime called RnG (Rhythm n Grime) (pronounced: Riddim n Grime). On 8 July 2011, the album was released as a free download via his Twitter account.

Track listing

References

External links
Wiley Reveals Chill Out Zone Tracklist « RWD: Grime, Hip Hop, Dubstep, Funky, Pop, R&B, House, News, Interviews, Videos, Audio and Fashion
Wiley ft. Ed Sheeran: 'If I Could'
Wiley Ft. Keyz – Out The Box (Snippet) [AUDIO « RWD: Grime, Hip Hop, Dubstep, Funky, Pop, R&B, House, News, Interviews, Videos, Audio and Fashion]
Wiley - Out The Box ft Keyz - Listen/Watch Now

Wiley (musician) albums
2011 debut EPs